Events from the year 1980 in Canada.

Incumbents

Crown 
 Monarch – Elizabeth II

Federal government 
 Governor General – Edward Schreyer
 Prime Minister – Joe Clark (until March 3) then Pierre Trudeau
 Chief Justice – Bora Laskin (Ontario)
 Parliament – 32nd (from April 14)

Provincial governments

Lieutenant governors 
Lieutenant Governor of Alberta – Francis Charles Lynch-Staunton  
Lieutenant Governor of British Columbia – Henry Pybus Bell-Irving 
Lieutenant Governor of Manitoba – Francis Lawrence Jobin 
Lieutenant Governor of New Brunswick – Hédard Robichaud
Lieutenant Governor of Newfoundland – Gordon Arnaud Winter 
Lieutenant Governor of Nova Scotia – John Elvin Shaffner 
Lieutenant Governor of Ontario – Pauline Mills McGibbon (until September 15) then John Black Aird 
Lieutenant Governor of Prince Edward Island – Gordon Lockhart Bennett (until January 14) then Joseph Aubin Doiron 
Lieutenant Governor of Quebec – Jean-Pierre Côté
Lieutenant Governor of Saskatchewan – Irwin McIntosh

Premiers 
Premier of Alberta – Peter Lougheed  
Premier of British Columbia – Bill Bennett 
Premier of Manitoba – Sterling Lyon 
Premier of New Brunswick – Richard Hatfield
Premier of Newfoundland – Brian Peckford 
Premier of Nova Scotia – John Buchanan 
Premier of Ontario – Bill Davis 
Premier of Prince Edward Island – Angus MacLean
Premier of Quebec – René Lévesque
Premier of Saskatchewan – Allan Blakeney

Territorial governments

Commissioners 
 Commissioner of Yukon – Douglas Bell
 Commissioner of Northwest Territories – John Havelock Parker

Premiers 
Premier of the Northwest Territories – George Braden (from June 16)
Premier of Yukon – Chris Pearson

Events

January to June

 January 21 – Three Soviet embassy workers are expelled after they are accused of spying
 January 28 – Canadian ambassador to Iran, Ken Taylor, organizes the escape of American citizens from Iran
 February 5 – Fort Chimo, Quebec, is renamed to Kuujjuaq.
 February 18 – Federal election: Pierre Trudeau's Liberals win a majority, defeating Joe Clark's PCs
 February 29 – Jeanne Sauvé becomes first woman Speaker of the House of Commons
 March 3 – Pierre Trudeau becomes prime minister for the second time, replacing Joe Clark
 April 12 – Terry Fox begins his Marathon of Hope run across Canada in support of cancer research
 May 20 – Quebec votes against separation in the 1980 Quebec referendum
 June 16 – George Braden becomes government leader of the Northwest Territories, as responsible government is reinstituted for the first time since 1905.

July to December
 July 1 – "O Canada" becomes the official  national anthem
 July 30 – Elizabeth II augments the coat of arms of Alberta with a crest and supporters
 August 14 – Dorothy Stratten, an actress, is raped and killed in Los Angeles by Paul Snider before he commits suicide.
 August 16 to August 23 – First Session of the Youth Parliament of Canada/Parlement jeunesse du Canada held in the Senate chambers of the Canadian Parliament Buildings in Ottawa.
 August 27 – The Winnipeg Tribune and the Ottawa Journal, two Canadian broadsheet newspapers, owned by Southam and Thomson newspapers are closed.
 September 1 – Due to a return of his cancer Terry Fox curtails his run
 September 1 – Saskatchewan and Alberta celebrate the 75th anniversaries of their establishment as provinces, culminating a summer full of festivals and special events
 October 6 – The Quebec and Newfoundland governments sign the Churchill Falls hydro agreement.
 October 6 – Trudeau announces his plan to patriate the Canadian constitution unilaterally
 October 28 – The National Energy Program is introduced
 November 17 – Clifford Olson rapes and kills his first victim

Arts and literature

New Works
 Mordecai Richler – Joshua Then and Now

Awards
 See 1980 Governor General's Awards for a complete list of winners and finalists for those awards.
 Books in Canada First Novel Award: Clark Blaise, Lunar Attractions
 Stephen Leacock Award: Donald Jack, Me Bandy, You Cissie
 Vicky Metcalf Award: John Craig

Television
 The Royal Canadian Air Farce makes it first television special

Film
 April 14 – The National Film Board wins an Oscar for its animated films.

Sport
March 16 – The Alberta Golden Bears win their University Cup by defeating the Regina Cougars 7 to 3. The final game was played at the  Regina Agridome
April 22 – Canada announces it will join the boycott of the 1980 Summer Olympics due to the Soviet Invasion of Afghanistan.
April 30 – Hockey player Gordie Howe retires
May 11 – The Cornwall Royals win their second Memorial Cup by defeating the Peterborough Petes 3 to 2. The final game was played at the Keystone Centre in Brandon, Manitoba
May 21 – The Atlanta Flames relocate to Calgary, to become the 8th Canadian team in the NHL as the Calgary Flames
May 24 – Val Marie, Saskatchewan's Bryan Trottier of the New York Islanders is awarded the Conn Smythe trophy
October 10 – Wayne Gretzky plays in his first NHL game when his Edmonton Oilers are defeated by the Chicago Black Hawks
November 8 – Quebec City's Rick Martel wins his first World Wrestling Federation Tag Team Championship (with Tony Garea) by defeating the Wild Samoans in Allentown, Pennsylvania 
November 23 – The Edmonton Eskimos win their seventh (and third consecutive) Grey Cup by defeating the Hamilton Tiger-Cats  48 to 10 in the 68th Grey Cup played at Exhibition Stadium in Toronto
November 29 – The Alberta Golden Bears win their third (and last to date) Vanier Cup by defeating the Ottawa Gee-Gees 40–21 in the 16th Vanier Cup played at Varsity Stadium in Toronto

Full date unknown
 Walter Wolf Racing, first Canadian Formula One constructor, closes, its assets sold to Emerson Fittipaldi.

Births
 January 1 – Mark Nichols, curler
 January 19 – Luke Macfarlane, actor and musician
 January 20 – Philippe Gagnon, Paralympic swimmer
 January 21 – Kevin McKenna, footballer
 January 22 – Amy Cotton, judoka
 January 28 – Nathan Marsters, ice hockey player (d. 2009)
 February 6 – Kim Poirier, actress 
 February 9
 Liam Cormier, musician
 Michelle Currie, skater 
 February 10 – Mike Ribeiro, ice hockey player
 February 14 – Michelle Rempel, Conservative MP
 February 16 – Blair Betts, ice hockey player
 February 17 – Zachary Bennett, actor and musician
 February 21 
 Brad Fast, ice hockey player 
 Yannick Lupien, swimmer
 February 23 – Yvonne Tousek, artistic gymnast
 February 29 – Simon Gagné, ice hockey player
 March 1 – Manmeet Bhullar, lawyer and politician (d. 2015)
 March 2 – Julia Chantrey, actress  
 March 13 – Malindi Elmore, middle-distance athlete
 March 14 – Jessica Mulroney, fashion stylist  
 March 21 – Deryck Whibley, guitarist, lead vocalist, songwriter and producer
 March 24 – Ramzi Abid, ice hockey player
 March 31 – Michael Ryder, ice hockey player
 April 6 – Bardish Chagger, politician  
 April 10 – Sean Avery, ice hockey player 
 April 17 – Alaina Huffman, film and television actress  
 April 19 
 Mayko Nguyen, actress  
 Robyn Regehr, ice hockey player
 April 21 – Vincent Lecavalier, ice hockey player
 April 29 – Mathieu Biron, ice hockey player
 May 1 – Robin Randall, water polo player
 May 4 – Andrew Raycroft, ice hockey player
 May 5 – Noah Miller, water polo player
 May 8 – Benny Yau, entertainer 
 May 22 – Angela Whyte, hurdler
 May 26 – Richard Green, soldier killed in Afghanistan (d. 2002)
 May 29 – Valérie Hould-Marchand, synchronized swimmer
 June 5 – Mike Fisher, ice hockey player
 June 24 – Liane Balaban, actress  
 July 2 – Thomas Marks, water polo player
 July 11 – Tyson Kidd, wrestler
 July 15 – Jonathan Cheechoo, ice hockey player
 July 16 – Matt Peck, field hockey player
 July 21 – Scott Frandsen, rower and Olympic silver medallist
 July 27 – Paul Larmand, basketball player
 August 3 – Dominic Moore, ice hockey player
 August 5 – Mark Bell, ice hockey player
 August 9 – Charlie David, actor  
 August 21 – Jon Lajoie, comedian
 August 24 – Tanya Hunks, swimmer
 August 28 – Carly Pope, actress  
 August 29 – Perdita Felicien, hurdler
 September 2 – Dany Sabourin, French Canadian ice hockey goaltender and coach
 September 5 – Kevin Simm, singer (Liberty X)  
 September 9 – Félix Brillant, soccer player
 September 17 – Brent McMahon, triathlete
 September 19 – Adrian Cann, soccer player
 September 26 – Kerry DuWors, violinist, chamber musician and educator
 September 29 – Dallas Green, singer-songwriter  
 October 3 – Daniel DeSanto, film, television  and voice actor
 October 13 – Marc-André Bergeron, ice hockey player
 October 14 – Mike Munday, volleyball player
 October 21 – Mike Danton, ice hockey player
 November 4 – Erin Cumpstone, softball player
 November 9 
 Dominique Maltais, snowboarder and Olympic bronze medallist
 Ben Rutledge, rower, Olympic gold medallist and World Champion
 November 12 – Ryan Gosling, actor, musician, and producer
 November 16 – Carol Huynh, freestyle wrestler and Olympic gold medallist
 November 18 
 Dustin Kensrue, singer 
 Emanuel Sandhu, figure skater
 November 23 – Tracy Latimer, murder victim (d. 1993)
 December 1 – Joel A. Sutherland, author 
 December 2 – Adam Kreek, rower, Olympic gold medallist and World Champion
 December 9 – Ryder Hesjedal, cyclist

Full date unknown 
 Kent Abbott, rock musician (Grade) (d. 2013)

Deaths

January to July
 January 1 – Ernest Cormier, engineer and architect (b. 1885)
 March 5 – Jay Silverheels, actor (b. 1912)
 May 17 – Harold Connolly, journalist, newspaper editor, politician and Premier of Nova Scotia (b. 1901)
 July 23 – Sarto Fournier, politician and mayor of Montreal (b. 1903)

August to December
 August 14
 Dorothy Stratten, model, actress and murder victim (b. 1960)
 Paul Snider, murder (b. 1951)
 September 25 – Antonio Talbot, politician (b. 1900)

 October 17 – Richard Gavin Reid, politician and 7th Premier of Alberta (b. 1879)
 October 27 – Judy LaMarsh, politician and Minister, lawyer, author and broadcaster (b. 1924)
 November 4 – Elsie MacGill, the world's first female aircraft designer (b. 1905)
 November 18 – Conn Smythe, ice hockey manager and owner (b. 1895)
 November 21 – A. J. M. Smith, poet (b. 1902)
 November 22 – Jules Léger, diplomat and Governor General of Canada (b. 1913)
 December 7 – W. L. Morton, historian (b. 1908)
 December 9 – Dorise Nielson, politician (b. 1902)
 December 12 – Jean Lesage, lawyer, politician and Premier of Quebec (b. 1912)
 December 22 – Ethel Wilson, novelist and short story writer (b. 1888)
 December 31 – Marshall McLuhan, educator, philosopher, and scholar (b. 1911)

Full date unknown
 Ray Lawson, 17th Lieutenant Governor of Ontario (b. 1886)

See also 
 1980 in Canadian television
 List of Canadian films of 1980

References 

 
Years of the 20th century in Canada
Canada
1980 in North America